Sar Darreh (also known as Sar Dar) is a village in Seydun-e Shomali Rural District, Seydun District, Bagh-e Malek County, Khuzestan Province, Iran. At the 2006 census, its population was 962, in 181 families.

References 

Populated places in Bagh-e Malek County